Camp Candy is a 1989-1992 animated television series produced by DIC Animation City, Saban Entertainment and Worldvision Enterprises, in association with Frostbacks Productions, with comedian John Candy providing the voice for an animated version of himself. Thirteen new episodes ran in syndication in the 1992 season, distributed by Worldvision Enterprises, along with repeats of the previous episodes. The series was later rerun on the Fox Family cable channel from 1998 to 2001.

Plot
The show is set in a fictional summer camp run by John Candy. Twenty-six episodes of the series aired during the 1989 and 1990 television seasons on the NBC television network. Almost all episodes would begin where John Candy would be trying to show an outdoor skill to some kids, to which he would then say it reminded him of a story, where he would tell of the episode in narration. John was a dedicated leader of Camp Candy, a summer camp that is presumably built by him, and he tries to get various kids to get along. Some episodes focused on John, namely having to stave off the bankruptcy or ruination of his camp due to the plots of Rex DeForest III.

In the third season, Candy also appeared in live action segments, talking about nature and ecology. Several characters originating from SCTV that were performed by Candy or otherwise, also made guest appearances that season.

Characters
 John Candy (voiced by himself) - The fictional version of the actor who is the proprietor of Camp Candy who runs it with comical results.
 Nurse Molly (voiced by Valri Bromfield) - The camp nurse at Camp Candy.
 Robin (voiced by Danielle Fernandes in season 1, Cree Summer in season 2, Candi Milo in season 3) - A nature lover who is known for her sweet, shy and sensitive personality. She is very good at understanding and communicating with animals and loves being out in the wilderness, taking in all the nature around her. She hates to see any environment in danger or any animal hurt and wants to help everyone anyway she can. She's African-American and she has black hair tied in twin buns.
 Alexandra "Alex" (voiced by Chiara Zanni in season 1-2, E.G. Daily in season 3) - A tomboy who has a huge enjoyment of camping and sports. She is described as brash, outgoing and extremely courageous, never letting anything scare her. She also likes to take up the role as leader. However, her leader senses can make her way too bossy. Physical activity is her favourite hobby and always loves to participate in races, sports and always desires to have lots of exercise in her life. She has red hair that is tied in two pigtails.
 Vanessa van Pelt (voiced by Willow Johnson in season 1-2, Gail Matthius in season 3) - An extremely girly fashionista who comes from a rich family. She is very new to camping as she had been used to a wealthy, spoiled environment. As a result she can care more about her appearance and can come across as selfish, but in reality is still a supportive and charismatic person. Fashion is her specialty and never goes anywhere without any beauty essentials. She has long brown hair (in the comics her hair is auburn), with a portion of it held up in a whale spout ponytail.
 Richard "Rick" (voiced by Andrew Seebaran in season 1-2, E.G. Daily in season 3) - A prankster who comes from a family line of comedy. Rick is notable for his laidback and "Cool" attitude as well as his comedic nature. He loves to pull pranks on the campers and John just as much as he loves to act cool. However, he can get to the point of irritating and can even be very reckless at times. Rick's pranks can even become too much for the campers. He has blonde hair as well as green and pink shorts.
 Gregory "Binky" (voiced by Tony Ail in season 1-2, E.G. Daily in season 3) - The youngest of the campers and Iggy's younger brother. Binky is described as a daredevil and loves to seek out an adventure. He's very energetic, optimistic and very curious, always wanting to know more about the world without him. However, being the youngest he can get very careless about his safety, as well as coming across as a bit naive. He has short ash brown hair that is covered by a blue cap turning the other way.
 Iggy (voiced by Tom Davidson in season 1-2, Katie Leigh in season 3) - 
 Botch (voiced by Brian George) - The camp chef who debuts in the second season. He was an immigrant whose native country was never specified, but he spoke with an Eastern European accent. When not tending to his duties in the kitchen, Botch was seen practicing his shots at basketball.
 Duncan (voiced by George MacPherson) - 
 Rex DeForest III (voiced by Lewis Arquette) - The primary antagonist of the series. Rex DeForest III is a heartless and greedy businessman and entrepreneur who wants Camp Candy to be shut down and demolished in favor of building new luxurious resorts and condos. Rex's plans would always never work and Camp Candy would continue to stay open.
 Chester (voiced by Danny Mann) - Rex DeForest III's henchman. He was a dimwitted greaser who always followed Rex's orders. One episode had him revert to his childhood after falling into a "fountain of youth", which Rex takes advantage of to use Chester as a kid to join Camp Candy in order to cause trouble. However, Chester has a change of attitude and starts to think for himself once the Camp Candy kids accept him.
 Hob Nayles (voiced by Jess Harnell in season 3) - The strict head counselor of a rival camp called Camp Kickboot which is at the other side of the lake. Despite his personality, Hob can be a coward at times when it comes to things that would frighten him.

Cast

 John Candy as Himself, Bear (in "When It Rains...It Snows"), Yosh Schmenge (in "Saturday Night Polka Fever"), Dr. Tongue (in "Dr. Tongue's Amazing Adventures")
 Lewis Arquette as Rex DeForest III
 Valri Bromfield as Nurse Molly
 Danny Mann as Chester
 Andrew Seebaran as Rick (Seasons 1–2)
 Tom Davidson as Iggy (Seasons 1–2)
 Tony Ail as Binky (Seasons 1–2)
 Danielle Fernandes as Robin (Season 1)
 Chiara Zanni as Alex (Seasons 1–2)
 Willow Johnson as Vanessa (Seasons 1–2)
 Brian George as Botch (Season 2)
 George MacPherson as Duncan (Season 2)
 Cree Summer as Robin (Season 2)
 E.G. Daily as Rick, Binky, Alex (Season 3)
 Katie Leigh as Iggy (Season 3)
 Candi Milo as Robin (Season 3)
 Gail Matthius as Vanessa (Season 3)

Additional voice cast 

 Charlie Adler (Season 1)
 Tim Andres (Season 1)
 Lynda Boyd (Season 1)
 Scott Bremner (Season 1)
 Don Brown (Seasons 1–2)
 Jim Byrnes (Seasons 1–2)
 William Callaway (Season 1)
 Christopher Candy (Season 2–3)
 Jennifer Candy (Season 2–3)
 Victoria Carroll (Season 3)
 Garry Chalk (Seasons 1–2)
 Brent Chapman (Season 1)
 Babs Chula (Season 2)
 George Coe (Season 3)
 Ted Cole (Seasons 1–2)
 Ian James Corlett (Seasons 1–2)
 Bob Costas (Season 2)
 Michael Donovan (Season 1–2)
 Pat Fraley (Season 1)
 Lorena Gale (Seasons 1–2)
 Marcy Goldberg (Season 2)
 Michael Greer (Season 3)
 Jess Harnell as Hob Nayles (in "When It Rains...It Snows"), Duck (in "When It Rains...It Snows"), Weatherman (in "When It Rains...It Snows")
 Doc Harris (Season 1)
 Phil Hayes (Season 2)
 Mark Hildreth (Seasons 1–2)
 Michael Horse as Chief Leapin' Lizard (in "When It Rains...It Snows")
 Tino Insana as Perry Gravy (in "Dr. Tongue's Amazing Adventures")
 Alessandro Juliani (Season 1–2)
 Terry Klassen (Season 1)
 Maurice LaMarche (Season 2)
 David L. Lander (Season 3)
 Victoria Langston (Season 1)
 Eugene Levy as Pete (in "When it Rains...It Snows"), Schmenge (in "Saturday Night Polka Fever"), Bruno (in "Dr. Tongue's Amazing Adventures"), Stan Bobby Bittman (in "Bobby Bittman")
 Andrea Martin as Miss Woodenhouse (in "Lucky Dog")
 Roddy McDowall (Season 3)
 Shane Meier (Season 2)
 Jason Michas (Season 2)
 Jane Mortifee (Season 2)
 Richard Newman (Season 2)
 Bailee Ostry (Season 1)
 Doug Parker (Seasons 1–2)
 Alvin Sanders (Season 2)
 James Sherry (Season 1)
 Hal Smith (Season 3)
 Kath Soucie (Season 3)
 Dave Thomas as Mr. Schnope (in "Bobby Bittman")
 Marcia Wallace (Season 3)
 Frank Welker as Lucky (in "Lucky Dog")
 Cathy Weseluck (Season 1)
 Dale Wilson (Season 2)
 William Windom (Season 3)
 Tomm Wright (Season 1)

Episodes

Series overview 
<onlyinclude>

Season 1 (1989)

Season 2 (1990–1991)

Season 3 (1992)

Production

Songs
Harry Nilsson wrote the series' theme song, which he sang with Candy. In both versions, the closing credits featured songs about Camp Candy that were sung to the tune of various traditional camp songs such as "Bingo" (spoofed as "Candy"), "Miss Suzie" (parodied as "We Have a Camp Called Candy"), "On Top Of Old Smoky" (parodied as "On Top of Mount Frostback"), "Yankee Doodle Boy" (parodied as "Big John Candy"), "She'll Be Comin' Around the Mountain" and "The Daring Young Man on the Flying Trapeze" (parodied as "Circus Parade").

Comics
The animated series spawned a brief comic book series based on the show; also entitled Camp Candy, it was published by Marvel Comics' Star Comics imprint.

References

External links
 
 The Big cartoon Database's list of Camp Candy episodes

1980s American animated television series
1990s American animated television series
1989 American television series debuts
1992 American television series endings
1980s Canadian animated television series
1990s Canadian animated television series
1989 Canadian television series debuts
1992 Canadian television series endings
American children's animated adventure television series
American children's animated comedy television series
American television series with live action and animation
Canadian children's animated adventure television series
Canadian children's animated comedy television series
Canadian television series with live action and animation
NBC original programming
Cultural depictions of American men
Cultural depictions of actors
Cultural depictions of comedians
Animation based on real people
Television shows set in Colorado
Television series by DIC Entertainment
Television series by Saban Entertainment
English-language television shows
First-run syndicated television programs in the United States
Animated television series about children
Television series about summer camps